The Sun Fizz 40, or just Sun Fizz, is a French sailboat that was designed by Philippe Briand as a cruiser and first built in 1980.

The design was developed into the O'Day 39 in 1982 for United States market.

Production
The design was built by Jeanneau in France , from 1980 to 1986, with 651 boats completed.

Design
The Sun Fizz 40 is a recreational keelboat, built predominantly of polyester fiberglass, with wood trim. It has a masthead sloop rig, with a deck-stepped mast, two sets of unswept spreaders and aluminum spars with stainless steel 1X19 wire rigging. The hull has a raked stem, a reverse transom, an internally mounted spade-type rudder controlled by a wheel and a fixed fin keel or optional stub keel and retractable centerboard. The fin keel version displaces  and carries  of iron ballast, while the centerboard-equipped version displaces  and carries  of iron ballast.

The design has sleeping accommodation for nine people, with a double "V"-berth in the bow cabin, a "U"-shaped settee around a drop-down table and a straight settee in the main cabin and two aft cabins with a double berths. The galley is located on the port side just forward of the companionway ladder. The galley is "U"-shaped and is equipped with a two-burner stove, an ice box and a double sink. A navigation station is opposite the galley, on the starboard side. There are two heads, one just aft of the bow cabin on the port side and one on the starboard side in the aft cabin.

Operational history
In 2012 the British publication Yachting Monthly used a Sun Fizz 40 in a series of survivability and crash tests.

See also
List of sailing boat types

Related development
O'Day 39

References

External links
 - has errors
Sun Fizz 40 video tour

Keelboats
1980s sailboat type designs
Sailing yachts
Sailboat type designs by Philippe Briand
Sailboat types built by Jeanneau